The administrative divisions of Hebei, a province of the People's Republic of China, consists of prefecture-level divisions subdivided into county-level divisions then subdivided into township-level divisions.

Administrative divisions
All of these administrative divisions are explained in greater detail at Administrative divisions of the People's Republic of China. This chart lists only prefecture-level and county-level divisions of Hebei.

Recent changes in administrative divisions

Population composition

Prefectures

Counties

Drafted and proposed cities
Hebei is planning to re-organise the administrative divisions with an addition of three new prefecture-level cities, all to be located adjacent to Beijing and named in regard to their position with respect to the national capital:

Jingbei (meaning "North of Capital") will be carved from two counties in Zhangjiakou: Huailai and Zhuolu
Jingnan (meaning "South of Capital") will compose of a county-level city in Baoding: Zhuozhou
Jingdong ( meaning "East of Capital") will consist of three county-level administrative divisions in today's Langfang: Sanhe, Xianghe, and Dachang (Hui). They currently comprise the exclave situated between Beijing and Tianjin.

References

 
Hebei